III Steps Forward is a 2002 album by the band Download. It is a collection of new material, as well as outtakes from their albums III and Effector.

Track listing
 "Sticky Glandstin" (Key/Western) – 3:14
 "Dakota" (Key/Western) – 4:30
 "Resilient" (Key/Western) – 3:38
 "The Itch Of Trepanning" (Key/Western) – 2:47
 "Ratail Comb" (Key/Western) – 3:58
 "Manmade" (Key/Western/Robinson) – 4:02
 "Nor" (Key/Western) – 5:59
 "Walking, Talking" (Key/Western/Torres) – 3:59
 "D.O.G." (Key/Western/Torres) – 4:14
 "P.U.P." (Key/Western/Torres) – 4:29  "Bolantinis Pivoli" (Key/Western) – 1:46

Personnel
cEvin Key
Phil Western

Guests
Dre Robinson (additional electronics on "Manmade")
Omar Torres (additional electronics on tracks 8-10)

Design
Phil Western, Simon Paul & Scott Graham - sleeve design and layout
Phil Western & cEvin Key - photography

Additional notes
Part 3 of 7 "From the Vault..." series:  Limited edition of 1000
"dediCATed to d.o.g. and p.u.p.9/30/1985 - 11/14/2001 - 4/3/2002"

2002 albums
Download (band) albums